The 1977–78 Israel State Cup (Gvia HaMedina) was the 39th season of Israel's nationwide football cup competition and the 24th after the Israeli Declaration of Independence.

The competition was won by Maccabi Netanya, who have beaten Bnei Yehuda 2–1 at the final.

Results

Fifth Round

Sixth Round

Byes: Hapoel Kfar Saba, SK Nes Tziona.

Seventh Round

Byes: Hapoel Nazareth Illit, Hapoel Rishon LeZion.

Round of 16

Quarter-finals

Semi-finals

Final

References
100 Years of Football 1906-2006, Elisha Shohat (Israel), 2006, p. 244
Cup (Page 5) Hadshot HaSport, 20.11.1977, archive.football.co.il 
Cup (Pages 4-5) Hadshot HaSport, 1.1.1978, archive.football.co.il 
Cup (Pages 3-6) Hadshot HaSport, 12.2.1978, archive.football.co.il 

Israel State Cup
State Cup
Israel State Cup seasons